Sarableh is a city in and capital of Chardavol County, Ilam Province, Iran. At the 2006 census, its population was 9,703, in 2,079 families.

The city is populated by Kurds.

References

Populated places in Chardavol County
Cities in Ilam Province
Kurdish settlements in Ilam Province